Hatch Show Print is a print shop in Nashville, United States that specialises in printing concert posters.

Founded in 1879, it is known for its use of vintage wood type. It was donated in 1992 to the Country Music Hall of Fame and Museum and in 2013 moved inside the museum premises.

References

External links

Companies based in Nashville, Tennessee
1879 establishments in Tennessee
Country Music Hall of Fame and Museum
Printing companies of the United States